Wheeling Branch is a  long 1st order tributary to Tussocky Branch in Sussex County, Delaware.  This is the only stream of this name in the United States.

Course
Wheeling Branch rises about 1 mile southeast of Ralphs, Delaware and then flows north-northwest into Tussocky Branch about 0.5 miles east of Ralphs, Delaware.

Watershed
Wheeling Branch drains  of area, receives about 44.8 in/year of precipitation, has a topographic wetness index of 1,092.57 and is about 11% forested.

See also
List of Delaware rivers

References

Rivers of Delaware
Rivers of Sussex County, Delaware
Tributaries of the Nanticoke River